Dean Clark (born January 16, 1964) is a Canadian former ice hockey winger and head coach in the Western Hockey League. He played one game in the National Hockey League for the Edmonton Oilers in 1984.

Biography
Clark was born in Edmonton, Alberta. As a youth, he played in the 1976 and 1977 Quebec International Pee-Wee Hockey Tournaments with a minor ice hockey team from St. Albert, Alberta.

Clark spent three years playing in the Western Hockey League With the Kamloops Blazers from 1982–85, where he won a President's Cup in 1984 with the Blazers.  Clark's one game with the Oilers in 1983–84 was the only professional game he played. He played hockey with the Ferris State University Bulldogs in 1982-83.

Clark was drafted by the Edmonton Oilers in the 8th round, 167th overall in the 1982 NHL Entry Draft and played one NHL game for the Oilers.

Clark returned to the game in 1996 as head coach of the Calgary Hitmen after Graham James was forced to resign as Calgary's prior to the start of that season. In his first full year as Hitmen coach, Clark guided the formerly woeful franchise to a division title. This accomplishment earned him the Dunc McCallum Memorial Trophy as WHL coach of the year.  He was also named the CHL coach of the year. The next year, in 1998–99, he guided the Hitmen to their first WHL championship. Clark left the Hitmen after two more successful seasons after compiling a mark of 183–118–30–3. He holds the Hitmen records for games coached, wins, winning percentage and playoff wins.

Clark coached the Brandon Wheat Kings from 2001–03 before moving onto his position as coach of the Blazers. He was fired in his fourth season as Blazers coach on November 7, 2007. Clark recorded his 300th win as a coach with the Blazers in 2005, and is among the top ten winningest coaches in WHL playoff history. Clark is also the former head coach of the Prince George Cougars.

Career statistics

Regular season and playoffs

See also
 List of players who played only one game in the NHL

References

WHL news bulletin, July 17, 2001
WHL news bulletin, April 7, 2005

External links
 

1964 births
Living people
Alberta Golden Bears ice hockey players
Brandon Wheat Kings coaches
Calgary Hitmen coaches
Edmonton Oilers draft picks
Edmonton Oilers players
Ferris State Bulldogs men's ice hockey players
Kamloops Blazers coaches
Kamloops Blazers players
Kamloops Junior Oilers players
Prince George Cougars coaches
Ice hockey people from Edmonton
St. Albert Saints players